The Wirick-Simmons House is a historic home in Monticello, Florida. It is located at Jefferson and Pearl Streets. On June 30, 1972, it was added to the U.S. National Register of Historic Places.

The house owned by the Jefferson County Historical Association, and serves as the organization's headquarters.  Tours are offered during special events.

References

External links
Jefferson County Historical Association

Gallery

Houses on the National Register of Historic Places in Florida
National Register of Historic Places in Jefferson County, Florida
Houses in Jefferson County, Florida
Historic American Buildings Survey in Florida
Monticello, Florida
1830s establishments in Florida Territory